Montale is a comune (municipality) in the Province of Pistoia in the Italian region Tuscany, located about  northwest of Florence and about  east of Pistoia. 

Montale borders the following municipalities: Agliana, Cantagallo, Montemurlo, Pistoia.

Main sights
Castle of Smilea
Casa al Bosco
Church of Santa Cristina
Abbey of San Salvatore in Agna
Church of San Giovanni Evangelista

Twin towns

 Senlis, France
  Varaždin, Croatia

References

External links

 Official website

Cities and towns in Tuscany